Mark Barry Foster (born 1 August 1975) is an English professional golfer.

Career
Foster was born in Worksop. He won the English Amateur twice before turning professional in 1995. For the first few years as a professional he was troubled by back problems, but in 2001 he won twice on the Challenge Tour and topped the money list. He won for the first time on the European Tour at the 2003 Dunhill Championship in South Africa. In 2011 he had his career best finish on the Order of Merit in 32nd position.

Amateur wins
1992 Carris Trophy
1994 English Amateur
1995 English Amateur, Brabazon Trophy (tie with Colin Edwards)

Professional wins (3)

European Tour wins (1)

1Co-sanctioned by the Sunshine Tour

European Tour playoff record (1–1)

Sunshine Tour wins (2)

1Co-sanctioned by the Challenge Tour
2Co-sanctioned by the European Tour

Sunshine Tour playoff record (1–0)

Challenge Tour wins (2)

1Co-sanctioned by the Sunshine Tour

Results in major championships

CUT = missed the half-way cut
"T" = tied

Results in World Golf Championships

"T" indicates a tie for a place.

Team appearances
Amateur
European Youths' Team Championship (representing England): 1994
St Andrews Trophy (representing Great Britain & Ireland): 1994 (winners)
Walker Cup (representing Great Britain & Ireland): 1995 (winners)
European Amateur Team Championship (representing England): 1995

Professional
Seve Trophy (representing Great Britain & Ireland): 2011 (winners)

See also
2016 European Tour Qualifying School graduates
2017 European Tour Qualifying School graduates

References

External links

English male golfers
European Tour golfers
Sportspeople from Worksop
1975 births
Living people